The Florida Atlantic Owls are the college softball team of Florida Atlantic University.

History
For the relatively young program (first fielding a team in 1995), the Florida Atlantic University softball team has been overwhelmingly successful under the leadership of former head coach, Joan Joyce.  In twelve seasons of competition in the Atlantic Sun Conference (from 1995 to 2006), the Lady Owls won the conference championship nine times, including eight consecutive championships from 1997 through 2004.  The Owls added their tenth conference championship in their first season in the Sun Belt Conference in 2007. The team currently participates in the East Division of Conference USA. 

On March 18, 2022, Joyce earned her 1,000th career win as a head coach, becoming the 27th NCAA Division I softball coach to reach the milestone. She died on March 26, 2022.

See also
List of NCAA Division I softball programs

References

 
1995 establishments in Florida
Sports clubs established in 1995